The Adath Jeshurun of Jassy Synagogue is a now defunct synagogue built in 1904 on Rivington Street near Eldridge Street on the Lower East Side of Manhattan, New York City.

In 1912, a group of Polish Jews from Warsaw acquired the building and renamed it Erste Warshawer Synagogue.

The style is Moorish Revival by architect Emery Roth.

References

Synagogues in Manhattan
Moorish Revival architecture in New York City
1904 establishments in New York City
Lower East Side
Moorish Revival synagogues
Former synagogues in New York (state)
Synagogues completed in 1904
Orthodox synagogues in New York City
Polish-Jewish culture in New York City